The 2010 Men's Junior South American Volleyball Championship was the 20th edition of the tournament, organised by South America's governing volleyball body, the Confederación Sudamericana de Voleibol (CSV).

Competing nations
The following national teams participated in the tournament; teams were seeded according to how they finished in the previous edition of the tournament:

First round

Pool A

|}

|}

Pool B

|}

|}

Final round

5th to 8th places bracket

Championship bracket

Classification 5th to 8th

|}

Semifinals

|}

7th place match

|}

5th place match

|}

3rd place match

|}

Final

|}

Final standing

Individual awards

Most Valuable Player

Best Spiker

Best Blocker

Best Server

Best Digger

Best Setter

Best Receiver

Best Libero

References 

Men's South American Volleyball Championships
S
Volleyball
V
Youth sport in Chile